Simon Fraser of Lovat (19 October 1726 – 8 February 1782) was a son of a notorious Jacobite clan chief, but he went on to serve with distinction in the British army. He also raised forces which served in the Seven Years' War against the French in Quebec, as well as the American War of Independence. Simon was the 19th Chief of the Clan Fraser of Lovat.

Master of Lovat
Simon's mother was Margaret Grant, and his father Simon "the Fox" Fraser, Lord Lovat, chief of the Clan Fraser. As the first born boy (after several sisters) he was his father's heir, and hence the Master of Lovat.  He grew up in the ancestral home of Castle Dounie, near Beauly, and was educated in Edinburgh and St Andrew's University.

The '45 
Simon 'would not have had any concern in this rebellion, had he been entirely left to himself', according to one of his father's secretaries of the period. This was confirmed by another, who noted that his father was a 'very strict man' with great power over his children. So, at his father's bidding, Simon led his clansmen out in favour of Charles Edward Stuart in December 1745.

He was not present at the battle of Culloden. Instead, Charles Fraser of Inverallochy commanded about 300 Frasers, who were in the front of the Jacobite lines and reached the British front line after a short charge. However, confronted with a second line of Hanoverian troops, their impetus was lost and they retreated in some disorder, leaving many dead and wounded behind.

There are various stories about the Master of Lovat at this moment in history. One traditional story is that, as the first of the Jacobites fleeing from Culloden approached Inverness, they were met by a battalion of Frasers led by the Master of Lovat. He immediately about-turned his men and marched down the road back towards Inverness, with pipes playing and colours. A second story is that he intended to hold the bridge which spans the river Ness until he was persuaded against it. In a third account, recounted in 'The Last Highlander' by Sarah Fraser, he intended to continue on to the fight at Culloden moor but was scolded at the bridge by another Jacobite by the name of Evan Baillie: 'Fighting, by God, Master! You were not in the way when fighting might have been of service. You had best say nothing of it now'.

Rehabilitation and legal career 
Following the Battle of Culloden, after several weeks on the run, Simon surrendered to the Crown and was imprisoned in Edinburgh Castle from November 1746 to August 1747. He then remained in Glasgow ‘at the king’s pleasure’ where he studied law at Glasgow University.

Simon received a full pardon in 1750, the same year he was called to the Scottish bar. He burnished his establishment credentials by acting in 1752 as a counsel for the widow of Colin Roy Campbell against James Stewart in a notorious case known as the Appin Murder. Stewart was a member of the local Jacobite clan the Stewarts of Appin, who had recently suffered evictions on Campbell's orders. Stewart was found guilty of aiding and abetting by a jury composed largely of Campbells (the presiding judge was the Campbell chief) and Stewart was hanged.

In 1753 he offered himself as a candidate for the forthcoming general election for Inverness-shire (which had a total of about 26 electors) but the 3rd Duke of Argyll, worried this might reignite feelings of clanship, persuaded Fraser not to stand.

Military service
Britain’s war with France in North America raised problems of recruitment, and more in ‘desperation’ than inspiration, the government decided to recruit soldiers from the Highlands. Simon, whose hereditary title had been attainted following the Forty-Five, raised 800 men from the forfeited estate of his own family within a few weeks. He was commissioned as a lieutenant-colonel, and the regiment, originally called the 78th Regiment of Foot, was soon renamed the Fraser Highlanders.The uniform of the regiment was the full Highland dress, with musket and broadsword... and a sporran of badger's or otter's skin. An eagle's or hawk's feather was worn in their bonnets by the officers, while the soldiers ornamented theirs with a bunch of the distinguishing mark of the clan or district to which they severally belonged.The regiment were sent to North America in 1757, and wintered in Halifax, Nova Scotia. Here, Fraser fended off an attempt by his superiors to make the soldiers wear clothing thought more appropriate for the severe winters and hot summers of the continent. Their unique national dress even enhanced their fighting qualities, with one officer noting that alongside their bravery and their agility, 'their dress contribute to adapt them to this climate, and render them formidable'.

They fought with distinction against the French at the siege of Louisbourg in 1758 (under the command of General Wolfe), at the Battle of the Plains of Abraham in 1759, and at the capture of Montreal a year later.

In 1762 Fraser left his regiment to serve in Portugal, where he reached the temporary rank of major-general in command of Portuguese forces against the Spanish. The following year his regiment was disbanded whilst still in Canada and he was put on half-pay.

At the outbreak of the American War of Independence in 1775, General Fraser raised another regiment of two battalions, known as the 71st Regiment of Foot (informally known as the Fraser Highlanders), although he did not accompany them to North America.

Later life
In April 1761, the Duke of Argyll (who had opposed Fraser's standing for election) died. The next month Fraser was elected unopposed to the House of Commons seat of Inverness-shire, one day after his return from North America. He was re-elected three times, and remained a representative until his death. This is despite often being absent from the seat. A history of the House of Commons for this period notes 'a brief visit' in 1766, as well as his absence in Portugal in 1768. Indeed, he may have been the British Ambassador there in this period, since another source states he was representing the British Government in Lisbon in 1770.

In 1774 the Lovat estates were restored to him (but not the title). This was a full decade before other forfeited estates were restored, and was a measure of Fraser's service for the Crown. He nevertheless felt proud of his Scottish identity. In 1778, he was the founding member and first president of the Highland Society of London. Its overall aim was to 'promote the Interests of the Highlands', with its particular goals being to repeal the ban on Highland dress being worn, the promotion of Gaelic language, music and literature, establishing schools, agricultural improvement, the relief of distressed Highlanders, and 'keeping up the Martial Spirit; and rewarding the gallant achievements of the Highland Corps'.  His half brother Archibald joined the Society in the same year.

Fraser married Catherine Bristow, but they had no children together. He died in London in 1782 at the age of 56. His later life was marked by social respectability, albeit with some debt to his name. His half-brother, Archibald Campbell Fraser of Lovat, succeeded him as the 20th MacShimidh, or Chief of Clan Fraser.

Fraser in fiction 
Simon Fraser appears twice in fiction, but each time in an unflattering light. He is a character in the novel Catriona written in 1893 by Robert Louis Stevenson. (Events and characters in the novel relate to the Appin Murder).  He and his father, Simon "The Old Fox", appear as characters in Diana Gabaldon's 1992 novel Dragonfly in Amber, the second novel in her Outlander series. In it, "The Old Fox" is the grandsire of Jamie Fraser and Lovat is his half-uncle, an indecisive young man, easily manipulated. Lovat is played by James Parris in Season 2 of the television series Outlander.

Fraser's depiction 
The image of Fraser above may actually be of his half-brother, Archibald. This is discussed at length on Archibald's Wikipedia page.

References

Piebracht, Lord Lovat's Lament

Bibliography 
Duffy, Christopher (2003) The '45. Bonnie Prince Charlie and the Untold Story of the Jacobite Rising. Orion Books Ltd. 
Fraser, Marie (2005) 'The Old 78th Regiment of Foot', article on Clan Fraser of Canada society website. https://web.archive.org/web/20061021041126/http://clanfraser.ca/78th.htm Accessed 6/3/16.
Fraser, Sarah (2012) The Last Highlander. Scotland's Most Notorious Clan Chief, Rebel and Double Agent. Harper Press, London. 
Lenman, Bruce (1984) The Jacobite Clans of the Great Glen 1650-1784. Scottish Cultural Press, Dalkeith. 
Mackenzie, Alexander (1896) History of the Frasers of Lovat, with genealogies of the principal families of the name: to which is added those of Dunballoch and Phopachy. A&W Mackenzie, Inverness.
 Macpherson, Alan Gibson (1996) A Day’s March to Ruin. The Badenoch men in the ‘forty-five and Col. Ewen Macpherson of Cluny.   Clan MacPherson Association, Newtonmore.   (pbk)
 Namier, Lewis & Brooke, John (1964, republished 1985) The House of Commons 1754-1790. Seeker & Warburg, London.
Sinclair, John (1813) An Account of the Highland Society of London, from its establishment in May 1773, to the commencement of the year 1813. B. McMillan, London. 

|-

1726 births
1782 deaths
Clan Fraser
78th Fraser Highlanders officers
British Army major generals
Jacobite military personnel of the Jacobite rising of 1745
British Army personnel of the French and Indian War
British Army personnel of the American Revolutionary War
Members of the Parliament of Great Britain for Scottish constituencies
British MPs 1761–1768
British MPs 1768–1774
British MPs 1774–1780
British MPs 1780–1784
Fraser, Simon Fraser, 2nd Duke of